The 1967–68 Norwegian 1. Divisjon season was the 29th season of ice hockey in Norway. Eight teams participated in the league, and Valerenga Ishockey won the championship.

First round

Final round

External links 
 Norwegian Ice Hockey Federation

Nor
GET-ligaen seasons
1967 in Norwegian sport
1968 in Norwegian sport